The men's horizontal bar competition was one of eight events for male competitors in artistic gymnastics at the 1992 Summer Olympics in Barcelona. The qualification and final rounds took place on July 27, 29 and August 2 at the Palau dels Esports de Barcelona. There were 93 competitors from 25 nations, with nations in the team event having 6 gymnasts while other nations could have up to 3 gymnasts. The event was won by Trent Dimas of the United States, the nation's first victory in the event since 1932 and fourth gold medal in the horizontal bar overall (tying the Soviet Union for second-most all-time after Japan with six). Andreas Wecker of Germany earned silver in the nation's return after unification; the first medal for "Germany" in the event since 1952. The Unified Team's Grigory Misutin took bronze.

Background

This was the 18th appearance of the event, which is one of the five apparatus events held every time there were apparatus events at the Summer Olympics (no apparatus events were held in 1900, 1908, 1912, or 1920). Three of the eight finalists from 1988 returned: bronze medalist Marius Gherman of Romania, seventh-place finisher Curtis Hibbert of Canada, and eighth-place finisher Andreas Wecker of East Germany (now competing for unified Germany). Grigory Misutin of the Unified Team was the reigning (1992) world champion; China's Li Chunyang had won in 1989 and 1991, sharing the title in the latter year with Germany's Ralf Büchner.

Puerto Rico and Slovenia each made their debut in the men's horizontal bar; some former Soviet Republics competed as the Unified Team. The United States made its 16th appearance, most of any nation; the Americans had missed only the inaugural 1896 event and the boycotted 1980 Games.

Competition format

Each nation entered a team of six gymnasts or up to three individual gymnasts. All entrants in the gymnastics competitions performed both a compulsory exercise and a voluntary exercise for each apparatus. The scores for all 12 exercises were summed to give an individual all-around score. These exercise scores were also used for qualification for the apparatus finals. The two exercises (compulsory and voluntary) for each apparatus were summed to give an apparatus score. The top eight gymnasts, with a limit of two per nation, advanced to the final. In a change from previous years, the preliminary score had no effect on the final; once the eight finalists were selected, their ranking depended only on the final exercise. Non-finalists were ranked 9th through 93rd based on preliminary score.

Schedule

All times are Central European Summer Time (UTC+2)

Results

Ninety-one gymnasts competed in the horizontal bar event during the compulsory and optional rounds on July 27 and 29. The eight highest scoring gymnasts advanced to the final on August 2. Each country was limited to two competitors in the final.

References

Official Olympic Report
www.gymnasticsresults.com

Men's horizontal bar
Men's 1992
Men's events at the 1992 Summer Olympics